TAFC may refer to:

Tonbridge Angels F.C.
Toronto Awaba FC
Torpoint Athletic F.C.
Tring Athletic F.C.

See also
TFC (disambiguation)